BGN/PCGN romanization system for Kyrgyz is a method for romanization of Cyrillic Kyrgyz texts, that is, their transliteration into the Latin alphabet as used in the English language.

The BGN/PCGN system for transcribing Kyrgyz was designed to be relatively intuitive for anglophones to pronounce. It is part of the larger set of BGN/PCGN romanizations, which includes methods for twenty-nine different languages.  It was developed by the United States Board on Geographic Names and by the Permanent Committee on Geographical Names for British Official Use.

This romanization of Kyrgyz can be rendered using the basic letters and punctuation found on English-language keyboards plus one diacritical mark: an umlaut (¨) to represent front vowels not otherwise represented by a roman character.  The interpunct character (·) can also optionally be used to avoid certain ambiguity presented by the use of digraphs (e.g. ⟨ng⟩ represents ⟨ң⟩, and ⟨n·g⟩ may be used to represent ⟨нг⟩).

The following table describes the system and provides examples.

See also
ISO 9

Notes

References
U.S. Board on Geographic Names Foreign Names Committee Staff, 1994.  Romanization Systems and Roman-Script Spelling Conventions, pp. 55–56.

Kyrgyz
Kyrgyz
Kyrgyz language